Jaap van Heusden (born 1979) is a Dutch film director. In 2018, he won the Golden Calf for Best Director award for the film In Blue.

References

External links 
 

Living people
1979 births
Mass media people from Utrecht (city)
Dutch film directors
Golden Calf winners